The Last Judgment also known as The Second Coming is an icon by Georgios Klontzas . The painting is a depiction of the return of Jesus Christ. The Second Coming is believed to be the final and infinite judgment by God of the people of every nation resulting in the approval of some and the penalizing of others. This painting is a depiction of that event. Klontzas was a Greek artist from the island of Crete. His artistic output was during the second half of the 16th century. He was affiliated with the early works of El Greco. He was one of the most productive Greek painters of the 16th century along with Michael Damaskinos. Klontzas was a member of the Cretan School. Most of his works were copied by other artists. His version of the Second Coming was used as a framework for other artists during the Late Cretan School. Leos Moskos and Francheskos Kavertzas both created similar versions.

The Judgment story has been reproduced in art since the inception of Christianity. Both Greek and Italian Byzantine artists used the theme. Notable Italian artist Fra Angelico created many versions of The Last Judgement. Michelangelo also used the theme in the Sistine Chapel. His work there was one of the most important works of the 16th century. Klontzas may have been exposed to the work and other Italian prototypes. Klontzas used the theme multiple times he also has a triptych featuring the Last Judgment. Both The Last Judgement Triptych and this work are in the collection of the Hellenic Institute of Venice in Italy.

Description
The painting is egg tempera and gold leaf on wood panel. The dimensions are 127 cm (36.2 in) × 50 cm (18.5 in), it was completed between 1580 and 1608. Around the vertical axis above the river of fire, which ends in Hell, Jesus appears as the judge, he arrives before mankind, to his left is John the Baptist, and the Virgin Mary is on his right. The apostles and a multitude of angels are also present. The Second Coming or Last Judgment has arrived. Under Jesus, there are angels on chariots. There are also symbols of the evangelists and people awaiting the hour of Judgment.

To the right and left of the cross, a magnificent musical ensemble appears, and four open books are presented by the artist. The books represent the book of life. Both Michelangelo and Fra Angelico feature similar figures. The musical angels are close to the gateway. Adjacent to the lava is the Archangel Michael with a sword guiding the damned into purgatory. Under the scene is hell.
 
Klontzas features demons and dragons in several of his works. His demons are painted in superlative detail. His dragons are the common green color. His paintings exhibit the 16th-century interpretation of the historic monsters. 
A large figure of Daniel is sitting on a rock, he holds a tablet facing the sinners. Below Daniel lies another large figure. The large figure is Ezekiel. He is in the lower portion facing the resurrection of the dead. They hold plaques with inscriptions referring to Hell. To our bottom left, there is a group of figures, the Greek inscription above them reads monks and martyrs. They are facing Daniel and Ezekial. Above the group is another group. Their Greek inscription reads from left to right: woman and kings followed by bishops and patriarchs. The top group below the band to our left features kings patriarchs and figures from the old testament. Noah is present, he holds the Ark, standing next to Noah, Abraham is with Isaac, Isaac holds his sacrifice. Moses is also present, he holds a tablet. Jonah appears with the whale at his feet.

Gallery

References 

17th-century paintings
Paintings in Venice
Cretan Renaissance paintings